Demet Bozkurt (born February 20, 1996) is a Turkish footballer, who plays for Fenerbahçe of the Turkish Women's First Football League with jersey number 4. She was part of the Turkey women's national under-19 football team in 2015.

Private life
Demet Bozkurt was born in Sarıyer district of Istanbul Province, Turkey on February 20, 1996.

Through her footballer career, she was able to enter the Marmara University to study physical education.

Playing career

Club
Bozkurt's curiosity for playing football started at a young age. Her mother told her that she might not continue to play football unless she received her school' good marks. She worked hard, and received good marks. Her mother took her then for registration at the local sports club. Bozkurt obtained her license from Kireçburnu Spor in her hometown on October 1, 2010. She became a defender, where she played all season. At the end of the 2014–15 season, she enjoyed her team's promotion from the Women's Second League to the First League.

In the second half of the 2016–17 season, she was transferred by Beşiktaş J.K., which was newly promoted to the First league. She enjoyed the champion title of her team in the 2018-19 First League season. She took part at the 2019–20 UEFA Women's Champions League - Group 9 matches.

International
Bozkurt was admitted to the Turkey women's national U-19 team, debuting in the friendly match against  Bosnia and Herzegovina on March 19, 2015. She took part in two matches of the 2015 UEFA Women's Under-19 Championship qualification – Elite round Group 3. She capped three time in total for Turkey women's U-19.

Career statistics
.

Honours 

 Turkish Women's First Football League
Beşiktaş J.K.
 Winners (2): 2018–19, 2020–21,
 Runners-up (2): 2016–17, 2017–18

 Turkish Women's Second Football League
Kireçburnu Spor
 Runners-up (2): 2013-14, 2014-15

References

Living people
1996 births
People from Sarıyer
Footballers from Istanbul
Marmara University alumni
Turkish women's footballers
Women's association football defenders
Kireçburnu Spor players
Beşiktaş J.K. women's football players
Fenerbahçe S.K. women's football players
Turkish Women's Football Super League players